Priya Vasudev Mani Iyer (born 4 June 1984), known by her professional name Priyamani, is an Indian actress and former model, who works in the Telugu,Tamil,Kannada and a few Hindi and Malayalam industry and has acted in more than 60 films. She is a recipient of  Several Awards.

Priyamani made her acting debut through the 2003, Telugu film Evare Atagaadu. She gained widespread recognition for her role as a village girl Muththazhagu in the Tamil romantic drama Paruthiveeran in 2007, receiving a National Film Award for Best Actress and a Filmfare Award for Best Actress in Tamil for her performance. Her notable works include Raam (2009), Raavan (2010), Raavanan (2010), Pranchiyettan & the Saint (2010), Chaarulatha (2012) and Idolle Ramayana (2016). Apart from appearing in films she has also judged several dance reality shows across South Indian languages.

Early life

Priyamani Iyer was born and raised in Bangalore, Karnataka. She is from a Tamil Brahmin family. Her father, Vasudeva Mani Iyer, owns a plantation business and her mother, former national level badminton player, Lathamani Iyer, was a bank manager at Union Bank of India. She modelled for Kanchipuram Silk, Erode Bharani Silks and Lakshmi silks during her school years. When she was in the 12th Standard, Tamil director Bharathiraja introduced her to the film industry. While at school, she actively participated in extracurricular activities and in sports. She is the granddaughter of Carnatic vocalist, Kamala Kailas. She is the cousin of film actress, Vidya Balan and the niece of playback singer, Malgudi Shubha.

After completing her schooling, Priyamani modeled for print advertisements. Priyamani pursued a degree in Bachelor of Arts in psychology through correspondence.
She can think in English and speak in Tamil, Malayalam, Kannada, Telugu and Hindi fluently.

Career 
Priyamani made her debut with Telugu film, Evare Atagaadu. Although she began her acting career with Bharathiraja's Tamil film, Kangalal Kaidhu Sei, it was Evare Atagaadu which was released first. 

Priyamani then made her debut in Malayalam cinema with Sathyam. Then she was signed by Tamil film director and cinematographer Balu Mahendra to act in the 2005 drama Adhu Oru Kana Kaalam. Before release, Babith said "Priyamani has come up with an excellent performance in the movie. Adhu Oru Kana Kaalam was critically acclaimed but failed at the box office. However, she won acclaim for her performance in the film. In 2006, Priyamani starred in the Telugu film Pellaina Kothalo. The film was a hit and got her three Telugu films.

Priyamani managed to prove her acting credentials and commercial appeal with 2007's Paruthiveeran, directed by Ameer, in which she was co-starred with debutant Karthi. A rural subject which told the story of a notorious young villager in Madurai, the film won critical acclaim and became a surprise box-office blockbuster. She went on to win the National Film Award, followed by South Filmfare Award, Tamil Nadu State Film Award and an award at the Osian's Cinefan Festival of Asian and Arab Cinema.

She had another commercially successful film in Telugu, in the 2007 film Yamadonga and in the Tamil film Malaikottai. She again received critical acclaim in 2008 for her role in the Malayalam film Thirakkatha, in which she played a role based on the turbulent real-life story of late film actress Srividya. She won another Filmfare Award for her performance. In Tamil, she had a single release in 2008: Thotta.

In 2009 she had two Tamil releases, the masala film Arumugam and the remake of the Malayalam blockbuster Classmates, titled Ninaithale Inikkum. The former was a commercial failure: Her Kannada debut film Raam was also a commercial success. All three of her Telugu releases that year, however, (Drona, Mitrudu, Pravarakhyudu) did not do well at the box office. In 2010 she acted in the satirical film Pranchiyettan & the Saint which became the longest-running Malayalam film since 2005. She won a Filmfare nomination for her role as a Mumbai-based interior decorator in the film.

She was subsequently signed by director Mani Ratnam for his bilingual film, titled Raavanan and Raavan in Tamil and Hindi respectively. Soon after, she was hired by Bollywood director-producer Ram Gopal Varma for his bilingual film Rakht Charitra. Varma decided to cast her after seeing her National Award-winning performance in Paruthiveeran. Her Kannada film Vishnuvardhana became a blockbuster hit and later she starred in Anna Bond. Although the film was poorly received by critics and featured on Rediff's "Most Disappointing Kannada Films of 2012" list, it went on to become a successful venture at the box office. She appeared in an item number in the Bollywood film Chennai Express. She has completed shooting for a Malayalam film, The True Story and the Telugu film, Chandee, in which she plays Ganga the granddaughter of a freedom fighter, who seeks revenge for the problems her family had to face. She was cast opposite Darshan in the Kannada film Ambareesha in (2014).

In 2014, she posed for a PETA ad campaign, asking the public to boycott zoos that feature caged tigers.

Besides The Family Man, Priyamani was also in ZEE5's His Storyy, Narappa, and Virata Parvam.

Personal life
Priyamani married Mustafa Raj, an event organiser, in a private ceremony on 23 August 2017.

Filmography

Films

Television

Web series

As a host or judge

Short films

Awards and nominations

References

External links 

 
 

1984 births
Living people
Actresses from Bangalore
Indian film actresses
Indian web series actresses
Actresses in Tamil cinema
Actresses in Telugu cinema
Actresses in Malayalam cinema
Actresses in Kannada cinema
Actresses in Hindi cinema
Tamil actresses
Actresses from Palakkad
Non-Malayali Keralites
Female models from Bangalore
Female models from Kerala
Best Actress National Film Award winners
Tamil Nadu State Film Awards winners
Filmfare Awards South winners
South Indian International Movie Awards winners
21st-century Indian actresses